Arnold Bronckhorst, or Bronckorst or Van Bronckhorst ( 1565–1583) was a Flemish or Dutch painter who was court painter to James VI of Scotland.

Arnold's origins are unknown, and it is unclear if he was a member of the Dutch noble family of Van Bronckhorst.

Goldmining story
According to an account of gold mining in Scotland by Stephen Atkinson written in 1619, Bronckorst was working in London as an associate of the English painter Nicholas Hilliard. With a painter or prospector, Cornelius de Vos, Bronckhorst went to Scotland to invest in gold mining, meeting Regent Morton. According to Atkinson, Hilliard invested in the mine, and Bronckhorst went to Edinburgh to negotiate the sale of gold to the mint, unsuccessfully. However, he was hired by Morton to paint portraits "great and small" of the young king, James VI and I.

There is no further evidence for Hilliard's involvement in the venture. Cornelius de Vos is documented as a mineral prospector in Scotland in this period, prospecting for gold and salt with colleagues including John Achillay, but not as a painter. 

There is a record of a 'French painter' who made a portrait of the King in September 1573, during Morton's regency, for £10. Cornelius de Vos was made to review and lost his contract in 1575, which may reflect Atkinson's description of Bronckhorst negotiating with Regent Morton on behalf of de Vos.

Paintings and records

In England, a painter called "Arnold" was paid £4-6s-10d for a portrait of Henry Sidney in 1565. In Scotland, Arnold painted the King, Regent Morton, George Buchanan, and the Earl of Arran. According to the inventories of the Earl of Leicester, the earl had a portrait of the 'young king of Scots' in 1580, which may have been a copy of Arnold's picture. Leicester sent his own portrait to James VI, painted on canvas by Hubbard in 1583. Arnold was paid £130 Scots for portraits of James VI in April 1580.

James VI sits for a portrait at Stirling Castle
Sittings for the King's picture by the "Flemish painter", probably Arnold,  at Stirling Castle during the difficult political circumstances in 1579 were mentioned in letters sent to George Bowes in England, the brother of the diplomat Robert Bowes, by Archibald Douglas or John Colville. The letters were signed with a cipher "4°". The originals of these letters were formerly held in the archives of Streatlam Castle.

The portrait, a "portratur", was destined for Robert Bowes to give to Queen Elizabeth. The writer of the letter, Colville or Douglas, supervised the painter and the sittings, and sent the picture to England;

The Flemish painter is in Stirling, in working of the King's portraiture, but expelled forth of the place at the beginnings of thir (these) troubles. I am presently travelling (working) to obtain him license to see the King's presence thrice in the day, till the end of his work; quhilk (which) will be no sooner perfected nor nine days, after the obtaining of this license ...the king our sovereign's portraiture, according to his proportion in all parts, which has been so long in making, and so difficult in getting, that I have been almost wearied therwith.

A son of George Bowes, also called George, was later sent into Scotland as a mineral prospector at Wanlockhead in 1603 with Sir Bevis Bulmer, which may relate to Stephen Atkinson's gold-mining story. By September 1580, Arnold had completed a half and full length of the king and a portrait of George Buchanan for £64.

Royal appointment

After receiving £46 for portraits of James on 6 September 1581, on 19 September 1581 Arnold was appointed to the post of King's Painter, the first such appointment in Scotland. He received a privy seal letter of appointment guaranteeing the payment for life of £100 yearly from the "reddiast of his hienes' casualties and cofferis," meaning the treasurer was to make Arnold's payment a priority. The privy seal letter and account entries describe him as a flemyng.

Bronckorst returned to London in 1583 where he disappears from view. He was succeeded as court painter in Scotland by another Flemish artist, Adrian Vanson. Vanson was first recorded working in Scotland in June 1581, and appointed as the king's painter in May 1584. 

In October 1582, Mary, Queen of Scots, wrote to the French ambassador Michel de Castelnau in cipher code about a new type of portrait of James VI that he had sent her, presumably differing from the pictures made by Arnold Bronckorst.

One portrait signed and dated 1578 by Bronckorst survives; the English sitter Oliver St John of Bletso, was the father of a reluctant keeper and juror of Mary Queen of Scots.

Scots portraits
The National Galleries of Scotland hold a number of portraits by Bronckorst:

References

External links
 
 Biography at the National Galleries of Scotland (accessed 28 September 2007)
 MacDonald, Alexander, 'A Short Notice of Arnold Bronckhorst', in, Proceedings of the Society of Antiquaries of Scotland/Archaeologia Scotica, vol. 3, (1831) pp. 312–313.
 
 Arnold Van Bronckhorst
 Arnold Bronckhorst

Flemish Renaissance painters
Flemish portrait painters
Dutch painters
Year of death unknown
Scottish portrait painters
16th-century Scottish painters
Scottish male painters
Renaissance artists
Court painters
Year of birth unknown